Dionne Julia Bromfield (born 1 February 1996) is a British soul music singer, television presenter and television personality. Her debut album, Introducing Dionne Bromfield, was released in 2009 by Amy Winehouse's Lioness Records label. She first came to public attention after performing on the British TV show Strictly Come Dancing with Amy Winehouse on backing vocals. She is known for being one of the former presenters on Friday Download. On 15 July 2021, Bromfield released the single "Silly Love", nearly 10 years after the death of her godmother Amy Winehouse.

Life and career

1996–2009: Early life and musical beginnings 
Bromfield was born on 1 February 1996 in Tower Hamlets, East London to an English mother and a Jamaican father. She has two brothers, Bromfield grew up in Chislehurst, South London, and attended Gatehouse School in Victoria Park, London and later Beaverwood School for Girls in Chislehurst until 2009. Bromfield first appeared on YouTube singing a cover of Alicia Keys song "If I Ain't Got You" with (her godmother) Amy Winehouse.

Bromfield attended the Sylvia Young Theatre School in Westminster.

In September 2009, Bromfield was the first artist to be signed to Winehouse's record label, Lioness Records. On 25 September 2009, Bromfield performed alongside Winehouse at the Prince's Trust End of the Summer Ball and, on 10 October, Bromfield performed a cover of The Shirelles' 1960s hit "Mama Said", while Winehouse appeared as a backing singer on the British television show Strictly Come Dancing.

2009–2011: Introducing Dionne Bromfield and Good for the Soul 
Her debut album, Introducing Dionne Bromfield, was released on 12 October 2009, and the first single, "Mama Said", was released on 3 November 2009. On 10 December 2010, Bromfield performed at the Young Voices concerts at the Manchester M.E.N. Arena, on 12 January 2011 in London at the O2 Arena and the Motorpoint Arena in Sheffield. The album also features the song "Foolish Little Girl", as well as the second single, "Ain't No Mountain High Enough", which was released as a digital download featuring the b-side "I Saw Mummy Kissing Santa Claus". This album consisted of cover songs and contained no original material.

On 28 January 2011, it was announced that Bromfield has recorded a new single called "Yeah Right", co-written with Eg White, which features Diggy Simmons. The single, which was released as a digital download on 4 March and peaked at number 36 in the UK Singles Chart, is the lead single from her second album Good for the Soul, which was released on 4 July 2011. The album is composed completely of original material, written by Bromfield and many songwriters. A second single featuring Lil Twist, "Foolin'", was released on 17 June. This album has been promoted by Bromfield appearing on television shows such as Blue Peter and Fern.
Dionne is the new face of Gio-Goi jeans since 2011.

Bromfield has uploaded two episodes of a web show with Will Manning called Down With Dionne on YouTube. Episode 1 – The first episode was uploaded to YouTube on 6 April 2011. In this episode, Will helps Bromfield hunt down her fashion favourites, and she performs an impromptu performance of her hit single "Yeah Right" on Oxford Street. Episode 2 – The second episode was uploaded to YouTube on 15 April 2011. In this episode, Bromfield is challenged to hunt the pockets of witting Londoners, she meets Jessie J, and Will does an Irish Jig.

It was announced that she would present a show called Friday Download on CBBC, which premiered from 6 May to 5 August. The 13-part series will address themes such as music, dance, TV, comedy, movies, and lifestyle. Bromfield said, "I did the audition and there were loads of well-known actresses auditioning, too. I didn't think I stood a chance. I'd forgotten all about it until my mum came in to tell me I'd got the job! I didn't believe her at first! It's so exciting, and I can't wait to get started!"

On 1 July 2011, Dionne Bromfield and Tinchy Stryder's collaboration, "Spinnin' for 2012", was confirmed as the first official song for the 2012 Summer Olympics. The lyrics for the song, originally written and recorded by Speech Debelle, have been re-written by Tinchy and Bromfield. The song was released 23 September 2011.

On 20 July 2011, while performing at London's Roundhouse with The Wanted, Bromfield was joined on stage by Amy Winehouse. This was Winehouse's last public performance before her death on 23 July 2011, aged 27.
On 23 July, two hours after the announcement of Winehouse's death, Bromfield sang at Ponty's Big Weekend in Pontypridd, supporting The Wanted. Bromfield sang for 20 minutes, only slightly short of the scheduled half-hour set and left Wales immediately after the concert.

On 5 October 2011, in her first award nomination, Bromfield was nominated for Best R&B/Soul act, at the 2011 MOBO Awards (Music of Black Origin), as well as performing in the Amy Winehouse tribute, singing "Love Is A Losing Game" at the awards ceremony.
On 17 October 2011, a remix of "Ouch That Hurt" – as featured on the soundtrack to the film Demons Never Die and featuring rapper Mz Bratt – was released in the UK.

On 24–26 January 2012, Bromfield performed for the first time outside the UK, at the Summer Soul Festival, at São Paulo and Rio de Janeiro, in Brazil. That was the same festival that on 2011 brought Winehouse to Brazil. Her song "Move A Little Faster", from her second studio album Good for the Soul, was featured as the opening track for the Hawaii Five-0 episode "Lapa'au" ("Healing").

2012–present: Treat Me Right 
Bromfield recorded a new track, named 'Black Butterfly', in honour of Amy Winehouse. She told Sunday Mirror, "I want to continue Amy's legacy. It's an awful lot of pressure but it's also a massive compliment to think that I can. I was the last person she was with on stage and automatically people felt like that was saying something... There was a black butterfly that flew in at Amy's funeral and it landed on Kelly Osbourne's shoulder. It stayed there for the whole service then flew out as soon as the service had finished. It's probably the best song I've ever written, and I was crying when I recorded it." Winehouse's father, Mitch Winehouse, has also written about seeing the same butterfly in Amy, My Daughter.

In November 2015, she supported US girl group Fifth Harmony on their UK gigs in London and Manchester.

In 2021, Bromfield featured in the documentary Amy Winehouse & Me: Dionne's Story in regards to the tenth anniversary of Amy Winehouse's death. She also released a single called Silly Love.

Discography

Studio albums

Singles

Other songs

Soundtrack appearances

Videography

Music videos

Filmography

Awards and nominations

References

External links 

Video of Dionne Bromfield singing Mama Said, London 20 July 2011, with a guest appearance by her godmother Amy Winehouse, Winehouse's last public performance

Living people
1996 births
21st-century Black British women singers
Amy Winehouse
British contemporary R&B singers
English child singers
English people of Jamaican descent
English reggae musicians
English women singer-songwriters
English soul singers
English television presenters
British hip hop singers
Neo soul singers
People educated at Gatehouse School
People from the London Borough of Tower Hamlets
Reggae fusion artists